Coleophora carelica is a moth of the family Coleophoridae. It is found in Latvia, Estonia, Finland, and northern Russia.

The larvae feed on the leaves of Achillea millefolium and possibly Artemisia species.

References

carelica
Moths described in 1945
Moths of Europe